Petr Ptáček Jr. (born 16 October 2002) is a Czech racing driver who last competed for R-ace GP in the 2020 Formula Renault Eurocup. He was a member of the Sauber Junior Team in 2020.

Racing record

Racing career summary 

† As Ptáček was a guest driver, he was ineligible for points.

Complete Italian F4 Championship results
(key) (Races in bold indicate pole position) (Races in italics indicate fastest lap)

Complete F4 Spanish Championship results 
(key) (Races in bold indicate pole position) (Races in italics indicate fastest lap)

Complete ADAC Formula 4 Championship results
(key) (Races in bold indicate pole position) (Races in italics indicate fastest lap)

† As Ptáček was a guest driver, he was ineligible for points.

Complete Toyota Racing Series results 
(key) (Races in bold indicate pole position) (Races in italics indicate fastest lap)

Complete Formula Renault Eurocup results
(key) (Races in bold indicate pole position) (Races in italics indicate fastest lap)

References

External links 
 

Living people
2002 births
Sportspeople from Prague
Czech racing drivers
Formula Renault Eurocup drivers
Italian F4 Championship drivers
ADAC Formula 4 drivers
Spanish F4 Championship drivers
MRF Challenge Formula 2000 Championship drivers
Toyota Racing Series drivers
F3 Asian Championship drivers
US Racing drivers
Bhaitech drivers
Charouz Racing System drivers
MP Motorsport drivers
R-ace GP drivers
Karting World Championship drivers
UAE F4 Championship drivers
Sauber Motorsport drivers